Nilgiris is a Lok Sabha (Parliament of India) constituency in Tamil Nadu. Its Tamil Nadu Parliamentary Constituency number is 19 of 39. 
Since 2009 , this constituency is reserved for the candidates belonging to the Scheduled Castes.

Assembly segments
Nilgiris Lok Sabha constituency is composed of the following assembly segments:

Before 2009:

1.Mettupalayam

2.Avinashi (SC)

3.Thondamuthur (moved to Pollachi (Lok Sabha constituency) in 2009) 

4.Coonoor (SC)

5.Udhagamandalam

6.Gudalur

Members of the Parliament

Election results

2019

General Election 2014

General Election 2009

General Election 2004

See also
 Nilgiris district
 List of Constituencies of the Lok Sabha

References

External links
Nilgiris lok sabha constituency election 2019 date and schedule

Lok Sabha constituencies in Tamil Nadu
Nilgiris district